John B. Lacson Colleges Foundation (Bacolod), Inc. (JBLCF–Bacolod) is a private maritime college in Bacolod, Negros Occidental, Philippines.

It is a component school of the John B. Lacson Foundation, Inc. System; other component schools being John B. Lacson Foundation Maritime University - Arevalo, Inc., and John B. Lacson Foundation Maritime University - Molo, Inc.

History
In October 1948, Juan Lacson, a Master mariner, together with his brother, Frank Lacson founded the Iloilo Maritime Academy (now John B. Lacson Foundation Maritime University) in Iloilo. In 1972, the Arevalo unit was established, followed by the Bacolod unit in 1974 and the Molo unit two years later. The Puerto del Mar unit in Guimaras was established in 1991.

In 1994, the different units were reorganized into the John B. Lacson Foundation, Inc. System.

In 2015, the unit started the first batch of Junior High School and in 2017, it offered Senior High School with Maritime Tracks.

See also
List of tertiary schools in Bacolod

External links
Official website of John B. Lacson Colleges Foundation - Bacolod, Inc.
Official website of John B. Lacson Foundation Maritime University - Molo, Inc.
Official website of John B. Lacson Foundation Maritime University - Arevalo, Inc.
Official website of John B. Lacson Foundation - Training Center

References

Universities and colleges in Bacolod
Educational institutions established in 1954
1954 establishments in the Philippines